Perin McGregor Davey (born 5 February 1972) is an Australian politician who was elected as a Senator for New South Wales at the 2019 Australian federal election. She is a member of the National Party and is its Senate whip. On 30 May 2022, Davey was elected by her party to be its Deputy Leader after the 2022 Australian federal election.

Early career
Davey was born in Sydney on 5 February 1972. Her father Paul Davey was an ABC journalist who worked in the Canberra Press Gallery and later served as federal director of the National Party. He was born in England and she held British citizenship by descent until renouncing it in 2018 to stand for parliament.

Davey grew up in Canberra, attending Curtin Primary School and Alfred Deakin High School. After leaving school she spent three years as a cadet journalist for the Mudgee Guardian for three years. During the 1990s she worked as an extra via a casting agency, making television appearances on Home & Away, E Street, and Water Rats, and appearing in the films Heavenly Creatures and Two Hands. She was also a safari cook in Botswana for three years. Davey later worked as a consultant for public relations firm Gavin Anderson & Co. (2000–2005), as a farm administrator for the Australian Agricultural Company (2005–2010), and as water policy adviser and corporate affairs manager for Murray Irrigation Limited (2010–2017). She also had two periods of service as a reservist with the Royal Australian Army Ordnance Corps (1990–1993, 1998–2005).

Davey served on the board of the New South Wales Irrigators' Council from 2014 to 2016 and in 2017 was nominated to the board of the Murray-Darling Basin Authority by federal agriculture and water minister Barnaby Joyce. Her nomination was opposed by South Australian water minister Ian Hunter on the grounds that she was not independent. She eventually asked Joyce to withdraw her nomination, after it was reported that a New South Wales government official had been recorded offering her government data to "help irrigators exploit the Murray-Darling Basin Plan".

Politics
Davey joined the Nationals in 1998 and in 2000 worked as a media adviser to Senator Ron Boswell. Before entering parliament she held various offices in the New South Wales branch, including vice-chairman of the women's council, central council member, and chairman of the Deniliquin branch.

Davey was elected to the Senate at the 2019 federal election, in third place on the Coalition's ticket in New South Wales. Her term began on 1 July 2019. She was subsequently elected as the Nationals' Senate whip.

In a routine leadership spill following the 2022 federal election, Davey was elected Deputy Leader of the federal National Party.

Personal life
Davey lives with her husband John Dickie and two daughters on a property in Conargo.  she also owned an investment property in Canberra.

References 

1972 births
Living people
21st-century Australian politicians
21st-century Australian women politicians
Women members of the Australian Senate
National Party of Australia members of the Parliament of Australia
Members of the Australian Senate for New South Wales
Australian people of English descent
People who lost British citizenship